4 gegen Z (spoken Vier gegen Zet, also written as 4><Z, lit. "4 against Z") is a German children's television program shown on ARD and KI.KA in which four children are appointed as "Wächter" (guardians) by their deceased aunt Hedda to prevent Zanrelot, the "Herrscher der Finsternis" (lord of darkness) from leaving the underworld and gaining control over Lübeck. As of September 2006, two seasons of 13 episodes each have been broadcast. The show's success has sparked the creation of a total of 6 novelized versions of the television episodes.

Cast

References

"Von Hollywood nach Lübeck - Vier gegen Kier" at NDR Fernsehen (German)

External links
Official website (German)

German children's television series
2005 German television series debuts
2007 German television series endings
German-language television shows